The Ramotshere Moiloa Local Municipality council consists of thirty-seven members elected by mixed-member proportional representation. Nineteen councillors are elected by first-past-the-post voting in nineteen wards, while the remaining eighteen are chosen from party lists so that the total number of party representatives is proportional to the number of votes received. In the election of 1 November 2021 the African National Congress (ANC) won a majority of twenty-three seats.

Results 
The following table shows the composition of the council after past elections.

December 2000 election

The following table shows the results of the 2000 election.

March 2006 election

The following table shows the results of the 2006 election.

May 2011 election

The following table shows the results of the 2011 election.

August 2016 election

The following table shows the results of the 2016 election.

November 2021 election

In the aftermath of the election, the Forum for Democrats (FFD) contested the results, claiming a counting error by the Independent Electoral Commission (IEC). The IEC acknowledged the error, which saw the Economic Freedom Fighters (EFF) allocated six seats. Correcting the error would have seen one of these seats instead allocated to the FFD, but the municipality did not take action to replace the EFF councillor. The FFD (along with the Freedom Advocacy Network) approached the North West High Court, and the judgement awarded the seat to the FFD in March 2022.

The following table shows the results of the 2021 election after the recount.

References

Ramotshere Moiloa